Gemma Files is a Canadian horror writer, journalist, and film critic. Her short story, "The Emperor's Old Bones", won the International Horror Guild Award for Best Short Story of 1999. Five of her short stories were adapted for the television series The Hunger.

Biography 
Gemma Files was born in 1968 in London, England, to the actors Elva Mai Hoover and Gary Files.  Her family relocated to Toronto in 1969, where she resides today.  Files graduated Ryerson Polytechnic University in 1991 with a degree in journalism. She published her first horror fiction, "Fly-by-Night" in 1993. Various freelance assignments eventually led to a continuing position with entertainment periodical Eye Weekly, where she gained local repute as an insightful commentator on the horror genre, independent films and Canadian cinema.  She was listed by Cameron Bailey of NOW as one of the Top 10 Coolest People in Canadian Cinema for 1996.  She has also written reviews for www.film.com and for the Canadian horror magazine Rue Morgue.

In 2000 her award-winning story "The Emperor's Old Bones" was reprinted in The Year's Best Fantasy and Horror Thirteenth Annual Collection (ed. Terri Windling and Ellen Datlow).  In 2010 her Shirley Jackson Award-nominated novelette "each thing i show you is a piece of my death" was reprinted in The Best Horror of the Year, Volume Two (ed. Ellen Datlow).  Her short story "The Jacaranda Smile" was also a 2009 Shirley Jackson Award finalist. Her first novel, A Book of Tongues, won the 2010 Black Quill award for "Best Small Press Chill" from Dark Scribe Magazine; it was followed by the sequels A Rope of Thorns (2011) and A Tree of Bones (2012), together comprising "The Hexslinger Series". A Rope of Thorns was considered a "powerful sequel" to A Book of Tongues by Publishers Weekly.

Her book, We Will All Go Down Together (about a coven of witches and changelings), was given a favorable review by National Public Radio (NPR).

Her novel Experimental Film (2015) won the Shirley Jackson Award for Best Novel and the Sunburst Award for Best Canadian Speculative Fiction (Novel) in 2016.

Files was married in 2002 to science fiction and fantasy author Stephen J. Barringer  (with whom she co-wrote "'each thing i show you is a piece of my death"").  They have one son, Callum Jacob, born in September 2004.

Bibliography 
 Kissing Carrion: Stories, Prime Books/Wildside Press, 2003. 
 The Worm in Every Heart: Stories, Prime Books/Wildside Press, 2004. 
The Hexslinger series:
 A Book of Tongues: Volume One in the Hexslinger Series, ChiZne Publications, 2010. .
 A Rope of Thorns: Volume Two in the Hexslinger Series, ChiZine Publications, 2011. .
 A Tree of Bones: Volume Three in the Hexslinger Series, ChiZine Publications, 2012. 
 The Hexslinger Omnibus (eBook Edition), ChiZine Publications, 2013, ASIN B00EXOT72Q (contains three new short stories)
 We Will All Go Down Together: Stories of the Five-Family Coven, ChiZine Publications, 2014 
 Experimental Film, ChiZine Publications, 2015 
 Drawn Up From Deep Places, JournalStone, 2018.
 In That Endlessness, Our End, Grimscribe Press, 2021.

References

External links
 
 
(professional site)

1968 births
Living people
Canadian horror writers
Toronto Metropolitan University alumni
Canadian people of Australian descent
20th-century Canadian women writers
Women horror writers
21st-century Canadian women writers
20th-century Canadian short story writers
21st-century Canadian short story writers
Writers from London
21st-century Canadian novelists
Canadian women short story writers
Canadian women novelists
Writers from Toronto
English emigrants to Canada
Women film critics
Canadian film critics